Whispers of Terror is a Big Finish Productions audio drama based on the long-running British science fiction television series Doctor Who.

Summary
The Doctor and Peri find themselves in the Museum of Aural Antiquities, where every sound is stored for posterity – from the speeches of Visteen Krane to security service wire taps and interrogation tapes. But they also find an intruder, mysteriously changed recordings, and a dead body.

Before long the Doctor realises that there is more going on than a simple break-in or murder. How can he defeat a creature that is made of pure sound?

Cast

The Doctor — Colin Baker
Peri — Nicola Bryant
Amber Dent — Rebecca Jenkins
Goff Fotherill — Hylton Collins
Visteen Krane — Matthew Brehner
Radio Announcer — Harvey Summers
Museum Curator Gantman — Peter Miles
Miles Napton — Mark Trotman
Detective Berkeley — Nick Scovell
Hans Stengard — Steffan Boje
Beth Pernell — Lisa Bowerman
Computer Voice — Hylton Collins
Car Computer — Rebecca Jenkins

External links
Big Finish Productions – Whispers of Terror

Sixth Doctor audio plays
1999 audio plays